Ectrepesthoneura is a genus of fungus gnats in the family Mycetophilidae. There are more than 20 described species in Ectrepesthoneura.

Species
These 23 species belong to the genus Ectrepesthoneura:

E. bicolor (Coquillett, 1901)
E. bucera Plassmann, 1980
E. canadensis Zaitzev, 1993
E. chandleri Caspers, 1991
E. colyeri Chandler, 1980
E. gracilis Edwards, 1928
E. hirta (Winnertz, 1846)
E. japonica Sasakawa, 1961
E. laffooni Chandler, 1980
E. ledenikiensis Bechev, 1988
E. marceda Sherman, 1921
E. mikolajczyki Klimont & Krzeminska, 2016
E. montana Zaitzev, 1984
E. nigra Zaitzev, 1984
E. ovata Ostroverkhova, 1977
E. pubescens (Zetterstedt, 1860)
E. referta Plassmann, 1976
E. tori Zaitzev & Okland, 1994
E. yasamatsui Sasakawa, 1961
†E. rottensis Statz, 1944
†E. succinimontana Blagoderov & Grimaldi, 2004
†E. swolenskyi Blagoderov & Grimaldi, 2004
†W. magnifica (Meunier, 1904)

References

Further reading

 

Mycetophilidae
Articles created by Qbugbot
Bibionomorpha genera